Guangxi Finance Plaza is a supertall skyscraper in Nanning, Guangxi, China. Construction began in 2010 and was completed in 2016.

See also
List of tallest buildings in China

References

Skyscrapers in Guangxi
Skyscraper office buildings in China
Skyscraper hotels in China